Gerhard Nehls was born in Germany, moved to South Africa after World War II where he became a Christian missionary. The WorldCat international union catalog lists "60 works in 120 publications in 4 languages and 328 library holdings" by Nehls, with ten books as "the most widely held" in libraries.

References

Christian missionaries in Africa
Possibly living people
Year of birth missing